Quesnelia dubia is a species of flowering plant in the family Bromeliaceae, endemic to Brazil (the state of Bahia). It was first described in 2005. It is found in the Atlantic Forest ecoregion in southeastern Brazil.

See also

References

dubia
Endemic flora of Brazil
Flora of the Atlantic Forest
Flora of Bahia
Plants described in 2005